Rhynchomesostoma rostratum is a species of rhabdocoel flatworms in the family Typhloplanidae.

Description 
The animal is 1.5 to 3.5 mm long and transparent. The anterior end is retractable.

Taxonomy 
It was described by Otto Friedrich Müller in 1774 as Fasciola rostrata.

Distribution and habitat 
The species has been recorded in Europe, India, Kenya, Siberia, and the US.

Ecology and behavior 
It preys on oligochaetes, cladocerans, copepods, other microturbellarians, and mosquito larvae and other aquatic insects. It is preyed upon by the flatworm Phaenocora unipunctata.

References 

Rhabdocoela
Taxa named by Otto Friedrich Müller